Alexis Ravelo Betancor (Las Palmas de Gran Canaria 20 August 1971 - 30 January 2023) was a spanish writer who published crime fiction, short stories and flash fiction. His best known work is La estrategia del Pekinés, among other hardboiled novels featuring the atypical detective Eladio Monroy.

Novels 
 Tres funerales para Eladio Monroy, Anroart, 2006.
 La noche de piedra (La iniquidad I), Anroart, 2007.
 Sólo los muertos [Eladio Monroy 2], Anroart, 2008.
 Los días de mercurio (La iniquidad II), Anroart, 2010.
 Los tipos duros no leen poesía [Eladio Monroy 3], Anroart, 2011.
 Morir despacio [Eladio Monroy 4], Anroart, 2012.
 La estrategia del pequinés, Alrevés, 2013.
 La última tumba, EDAF, 2013.
 Las flores no sangran, Alrevés 2015.
 La otra vida de Ned Blackbird, Siruela, 2016.
 Los milagros prohibidos, Siruela, 2017.
 El peor de los tiempos [Eladio Monroy 5], Alrevés, 2017.
 La ceguera del cangrejo, Siruela, 2019.
 Un tío con una bolsa en la cabeza, Siruela, 2020.
 Si no hubiera mañana [Eladio Monroy 6], Alrevés, 2021.
 Los nombres prestados, Siruela, 2022.

References

1971 births
2023 deaths
21st-century Spanish writers
Writers from the Canary Islands
People from Las Palmas